The Charles University Rector election, 2013 was held when term of the incumbent Rector Václav Hampl ended. Former Dean of First Faculty of Medicine, Tomáš Zima was elected the new Chancellor. Hampl was ineligible to run for another term.

Candidates
Michal Stehlík, Dean of Faculty of Arts. He was originally considered a front-runner
Stanislav Štech, Vice Rector of the University.
Tomáš Zima, Former Dean of First Faculty of Medicine.

Voting

The Chancellor was elected by the academic senate, consisting of 36 lecturers and 34 students. A candidate needed 36 votes to be elected. Micha Stehlík was considered the front-runner but was eliminated in the first round. Zima was elected in the third round.

Czech President Miloš Zeman confirmed the election on 21 January 2014 and appointed Zima as the new Rector. Zima stated that he wanted fewer Bachelor students but more Masters' students. He also stated that he wants to defend academic freedom.

Notes

2013
2013 elections in the Czech Republic
Non-partisan elections